The Order of Altruism is one of the badges of honor in Iran, established by "The Council of Iran Ministers" on November 21, 1990 and modified on June 27, 2007. The order has three classes, and is awarded by President of Iran. According to Article 15 of the Regulations on the Awarding of Government Orders of Iran, the Order of Altruism due to commemorate this valuable trait, is awarded to individuals who are privileged in some of the following respects:

 Dedication and self-sacrifice for the sacred aims and purposes of the Islamic system, especially the sacrifices during the glorious victory of the Islamic Revolution and the sacred defense, and the provision of outstanding services to upbuild the country or to preserve and enhance the sacred system of the Islamic Republic
 Enduring material damages to provide critical and essential service
 Continuance effective social philanthropy and founding charities and establishing scientific, research and educational institutions in the community

Recipients
In addition to Article 15 of the Regulations on the Awarding of Government Orders of Iran (approved on November 21, 1990) stating the conditions for receiving the Order of Altruism, new conditions approved on February 22, 1995, May 23, 2007, October 21, 2009 and January 7, 2017 for granting this order to those injured in the Iran-Iraq war and fathers and mothers those who have lost their children in conjunction with the Iran-Iraq war or process of trying to win the Iranian Revolution, by the Council of Ministers of the time.

According to these decrees, so many people have been eligible to receive the Order of Altruism, that in every term this order was awarded to many of them by the president of the time.

In addition to these, the following people have also received this order:

Types
The Order of Altruism has three types of medal:

See also
 Order of Freedom (Iran)
 Order of Work and Production
 Order of Research
 Order of Mehr
 Order of Justice (Iran)
 Order of Construction
 Order of Knowledge
 Order of Education and Pedagogy
 Order of Persian Politeness
 Order of Independence (Iran)
 Order of Service
 Order of Courage (Iran)
 Order of Culture and Art
 Order of Merit and Management

References

External links
 Iran Awarding of Government Orders website
 Orders of Iran Regulations in diagrams
 Orders of Iran in diagrams
 Types of Iran's badges and their material benefits

CS1 uses Persian-language script (fa)
Awards established in 1990
Civil awards and decorations of Iran
1990 establishments in Iran